The Precisionist Stakes was an American Thoroughbred horse race run annually at Santa Anita Park in Arcadia, California.  A Grade III event open to horses, age three and up, it was contested over a distance of one and one-sixteenth miles on Cushion Track synthetic dirt. The race was named for the U.S. Racing Hall of Fame horse, Precisionist who won this race in 1985 in which he set a Hollywood Park track record for the then one mile distance.

The race was run as the Mervyn Leroy Handicap at Hollywood Park Racetrack from inception in 1980 through 2013 when that racetrack closed. The original race was named for the American film director, Mervyn LeRoy who was a racing enthusiast and one of the track's founders. The Mervyn LeRoy Handicap carried a purse of $150,000 and was a prep to the Hollywood Gold Cup.

Elevated to a Grade I event in 1988, it was downgraded to Grade II status in 1991 then to Grade III in 2014.

Records
Speed record:
  mile - 1:40.20 - Ruhlmann (1989)
 1 mile - 1:32.80 - Precisionist  (1985)

Most wins:
 2 - Surf Cat (2006, 2008)

Most wins by a jockey:
 4 - Laffit Pincay, Jr. (1986, 1987, 1989, 2002)

Most wins by a trainer:
 4 - Robert J. Frankel (1982, 1983, 1991, 1993)

Most wins by an owner:
 2 - Jerry Moss (1983, 1989)
 2 -  Rosendo G. Parra (2003, 2004)
 2 - Aase Headley & Marsha Naify (2006, 2008)

Winners

See also 
 Precisionist Stakes / Mervyn Leroy Handicap top three finishers and starters

References

 Precisionist Stakes at Pedigree Query
 The 2009 Mervyn LeRoy Handicap at Thoroughbred Times
 The Mervyn LeRoy Handicap at Hollywood Park

Graded stakes races in the United States
Horse races in California
Open mile category horse races
Recurring sporting events established in 1980
Hollywood Park Racetrack
1980 establishments in California